Kaliakair is a city in central Bangladesh, located in Gazipur District in the division of Dhaka. It is the administrative and urban centre of Kaliakair Upazila. About 213,061 people live here which makes this city the 26th largest city in Bangladesh.

Etymology
There is a popular belief that there was a big snake named Kalla Nag in a pond which is called pukur or pukair in Bengali. In course of time the name Kalla had changed as Kalia and Pukair had changed to Kair due to phonetic transformation. Thus the name Kaliakair was founded.

Geography

Demographics
According to 2011 Bangladesh census the total population of the city is 213,061 of which 111,307 are males and 101,754 are females with a density of 6019 persons per km2.The number of total household of the city is 43704.

Administration
Kaliakair city is governed by a Paurashava named Kaliakair municipality which consists of 9 wards and 18 mahallas, which occupies an area of 24.66 km2. Besides, there are 3 adjoining 3 other mauzas as the other urban areas which all together constitutes a total area of 27.16 km2.
Sreepur municipality occupies the total city area.

References

Cities in Bangladesh
Populated places in Dhaka Division